Vule Avdalović (born 24 November 1981) is a Serbian professional basketball coach and former player. He currently works as the head coach for OKK Beograd.

National team career
As a member of the FR Yugoslavia youth team, he won the gold medal at the 2001 Summer Universiade in Beijing.

For the Serbia and Montenegro senior team, he played at the 2003 EuroBasket, the 2004 Olympics, 2005 EuroBasket and the 2006 World Championship.

Head coach 
On 17 June 2022, OKK Beograd named Avdalović as their new head coach.

Career statistics

Euroleague

|-
| style="text-align:left;"| 2001–02
| style="text-align:left;" rowspan=4| Partizan
| 14 || 4 || 14.6 || .442 || .385 || .800 || 1.0 || 1.7 || .2 || .0 || 4.0 || 3.0
|-
| style="text-align:left;"| 2002–03
| 14 || 1 || 7.2 || .350 || .400 || .500 || .1 || .4 || .2 || .0 || 1.5 || - .2
|-
| style="text-align:left;"| 2003–04
| 14 || 2 || 23.1 || .384 || .385 || .810 || 1.4 || 1.6 || .9 || .1 || 7.5 || 5.1
|-
| style="text-align:left;"| 2004–05
| 10 || 9 || 33.3 || .474 || .462 || .780 || 2.7 || 4.1 || 2.1 || .1 || 13.1 || 17.6
|-
| style="text-align:left;"| 2010–11
| style="text-align:left;"| Cholet
| 10 || 4 || 27.7 || .338 || .250 || .806 || 1.8 || 3.6 || .4 || .0 || 8.5 || 9.4
|-
| style="text-align:left;"| 2012–13
| style="text-align:left;"| Alba Berlin
| 9 || 6 || 27.4 || .447 || .304 || .900 || 2.6 || 3.0 || .3 || .0 || 7.4 || 9.2
|- class="sortbottom"
| style="text-align:left;"| Career
| style="text-align:left;"|
| 71 || 35 || 21.0 || .410 || .366 || .792 || 1.5 || 2.2 || .7 || .0 || 6.5 || 6.5

Career achievements and awards
As player
 YUBA League champion: 5  (with Partizan: 2001–02, 2002–03, 2003–04, 2004–05)
 Ukrainian SuperLeague champion: 1  (with Donetsk: 2011–12)
 Yugoslav Cup winner: 2  (with Partizan: 1998–99, 2001–02)

Individual Awards
 Won the Three Point competition at the 2010 LNB All-star game

References

External links

 Vule Avdalović  at acb.com
 Vule Avdalović at eurobasket.com
 Vule Avdalović at euroleague.net

1981 births
Living people
ABA League players
Alba Berlin players
BC Donetsk players
CB Lucentum Alicante players
Cholet Basket players
KK Partizan players
Liga ACB players
Olympic basketball players of Serbia and Montenegro
People from Gacko
Point guards
Serbian men's basketball coaches
Serbian men's basketball players
Serbian expatriate basketball people in France
Serbian expatriate basketball people in Germany
Serbian expatriate basketball people in Spain
Serbian expatriate basketball people in Ukraine
Serbs of Bosnia and Herzegovina
Valencia Basket players
2006 FIBA World Championship players
Universiade medalists in basketball
Universiade gold medalists for Serbia and Montenegro